
This is a list of aircraft in alphabetical order beginning with 'S'.

Su

Sud Aviation 
 Sud Aviation SE-116 Voltigeur
 Sud Aviation SE-117 Voltigeur
 Sud Aviation SE-118 Diplomate
 Sud Aviation SE-210 Caravelle
 Sud Aviation SE-214 Caravelle
 Sud Aviation Alouette II
 Sud Aviation Alouette III
 Sud Aviation Djinn
 Sud Aviation Fennec
 Sud Aviation Puma
 Sud Aviation SA-3164
 Sud Aviation SA-3180
 Sud Aviation SA-340
 Sud Aviation SA-370 
 Sud Aviation X-370
 Sud Aviation X-375
 Sud Aviation Super Caravelle
 Sud Aviation Super Frelon
 Sud Aviation Vautour
 Sud Aviation Lama

Sud Aviation/BAC 
 Concorde

Sukhanov
 Sukhanov Discoplan

Sukhoi 
 Sukhoi Su-1
 Sukhoi Su-2
 Sukhoi Su-3
 Sukhoi Su-5
 Sukhoi Su-6
 Sukhoi Su-7
 Sukhoi Su-8
 Sukhoi Su-9 (straight-wing fighter of 1946)
 Sukhoi Su-9 (delta-wing fighter of 1956)
 Sukhoi Su-10
 Sukhoi Su-11 (straight-wing fighter of 1947)
 Sukhoi Su-11 (delta-wing fighter of 1958)
 Sukhoi Su-12
 Sukhoi Su-13
 Sukhoi Su-15 (fighter prototype of 1949)
 Sukhoi Su-15 (supersonic fighter of 1962)
 Sukhoi Su-17 (fighter prototype of 1949)
 Sukhoi Su-17 (variable-geometry attack aircraft of 1969)
 Sukhoi Su-20
 Sukhoi Su-22
 Sukhoi Su-24
 Sukhoi Su-25
 Sukhoi Su-26
 Sukhoi Su-27
 Sukhoi Su-30
 Sukhoi Su-32
 Sukhoi Su-33
 Sukhoi Su-34
 Sukhoi Su-35
 Sukhoi Su-35BM
 Sukhoi Su-37
 Sukhoi Su-28
 Sukhoi Su-29
 Sukhoi Su-31
 Sukhoi Su-39
 Sukhoi Su-47 Berkut
 Sukhoi Su-57
 Sukhoi P-1
 Sukhoi-Gulfstream S-21
 Sukhoi S-32
 Sukhoi S-37
 Sukhoi S-54
 Sukhoi S-80
 Sukhoi T-3
 Sukhoi T-4
 Sukhoi T-6
 Sukhoi T-10
 Sukhoi Superjet 100
 Sukhoi Superjet 130

Sullivan Aircraft Mfg CoSullivan 
((William P) Sullivan Aircraft Mfg Co, 630 E Gilbert St, Wichita, KS)
 Sullivan K-3 Crested Harpy

Sullivan Aircraft CoSullivan 
((W P) Sullivan Aircraft Co, 1693 Mission St, San Francisco, CA)
 Sullivan Goblin

Summit 
(Summit Aeronautical Corp (pres: M V D Towt), Westfield, MA c.1940: Bendix, NJ)
 Summit HM-5

Summit Aerosports
(Yale, MI)
Summit 2
Summit SS
Summit Steel Breeze
Summit 103 Mini Breeze

Sun 
(Sun Aerospace Group, Nappanee, IN)
 Sun Ray 100

Sunair UG
(Scheidegg, Bavaria, Germany)
Sunair Magic
Sunair Sunlight

Sun Lake 
(LanShe Aerospace aka Sun Lake Aircraft (pres: Wadi Rahim), Ft Pierce, FL)
 Sun Lake Buccaneer 2

Sunbeam
 Sunbeam 1917 Bomber

Sundog Powerchutes Inc
(Pierceland, Saskatchewan, Canada)
Sundog One-Seater
Sundog Two-Seater

Sundorph 
((Eiler C) Sundorph Aeronautical Corp, Cleveland, OH)
 Sundorph A-1 Special

Sundstedt-Hannevig 
(Hugo Sundstedt & Christoffer Hannevig)
 Sundstedt-Hannevig Sunrise – built by Wittemann-Lewis Aircraft Co

Sun Flightcraft
(Hofbauer GmbH, Innsbruck, Austria)
Sun Flightcraft Air-Chopper

Sunward Aircraft
(Sunward – Hunan Science and Technologies Co Ltd, Zhuzhou, Hunan, China)
Sunward Aurora
Sunward ST
Sunward STB
Sunward UAV

Super 18 
 Super 18 Model S18-180

Super Rotor 
(M.M. Super Rotor Brasileira Ltda)
 Super Rotor AC.1
 Super Rotor AC.4 Andorhina
 Super Rotor Agricóptero
 Super Rotor M.1 Montalva
 Super Rotor M.2 Trovão Azul ("Blue Thunder")

Super-Marine 
(Super-Marine Systems Inc, Graybar Bldg, NY)
 Super-Marine 1930 Biplane

Superior 
(Superior Aircraft Co, Dearborn, MI)
 Superior 1926 Biplane

Superior 
(Superior Aircraft Corp div of Priestly-Hunt Corp, Culver City, CA)
 Superior LCA
 Superior LFA
 Superior Satellite
 Superior V
 Superior V2

Supermarine 
 Supermarine Air Yacht
 Supermarine Attacker
 Supermarine Baby
 Supermarine Channel
 Supermarine Commercial Amphibian
 Supermarine Nanok
 Supermarine Nighthawk
 Supermarine Scapa
 Supermarine Scarab
 Supermarine Scylla
 Supermarine Scimitar
 Supermarine Sea Eagle
 Supermarine Sea King
 Supermarine Sea Lion I
 Supermarine Sea Lion II
 Supermarine Sea Lion III – re-engined Sea Lion II
 Supermarine Sea Otter
 Supermarine Sea Urchin
 Supermarine Seafang
 Supermarine Seafire
 Supermarine Seagull (1921)
 Supermarine Seagull V  – prototype Supermarine Walrus
 Supermarine Seagull ASR-1
 Supermarine Seal
 Supermarine Seamew
 Supermarine Sheldrake
 Supermarine Solent
 Supermarine Southampton
 Supermarine Sparrow
 Supermarine Spiteful
 Supermarine Spitfire
 Supermarine Stranraer
 Supermarine Swan
 Supermarine Swift
 Supermarine Walrus
 Supermarine S.4
 Supermarine S.5
 Supermarine S.6
 Supermarine S.6A
 Supermarine S.6B
 Supermarine Type 179
 Supermarine Type 221
 Supermarine Type 224
 Supermarine Type 227
 Supermarine Type 228
 Supermarine Type 235 – Southampton IV/Jumo for R28/33
 Supermarine Type 236
 Supermarine Type 300
 Supermarine Type 304
 Supermarine Type 309
 Supermarine Type 311
 Supermarine Type 316 – (Spec. B12/36)
 Supermarine Type 317 – (Spec. B12/36)
 Supermarine Type 318 – (Spec. B12/36)
 Supermarine Type 322 – (S.24/37 Dumbo)
 Supermarine Type 323
 Supermarine Type 326 Walrus Development
 Supermarine Type 329
 Supermarine Type 330
 Supermarine Type 331
 Supermarine Type 332
 Supermarine Type 335
 Supermarine Type 336
 Supermarine Type 337
 Supermarine Type 338
 Supermarine Type 341
 Supermarine Type 342
 Supermarine Type 343
 Supermarine Type 344
 Supermarine Type 345
 Supermarine Type 346
 Supermarine Type 348
 Supermarine Type 353
 Supermarine Type 349
 Supermarine Type 350
 Supermarine Type 351
 Supermarine Type 355
 Supermarine Type 356
 Supermarine Type 359
 Supermarine Type 360
 Supermarine Type 361
 Supermarine Type 362
 Supermarine Type 365
 Supermarine Type 366
 Supermarine Type 367
 Supermarine Type 369
 Supermarine Type 371
 Supermarine Type 372
 Supermarine Type 373
 Supermarine Type 374
 Supermarine Type 376
 Supermarine Type 378
 Supermarine Type 379
 Supermarine Type 380 – (Spec. S.24/37)
 Supermarine Type 381
 Supermarine Type 382
 Supermarine Type 385
 Supermarine Type 389
 Supermarine Type 390
 Supermarine Type 392 – prototype Attacker
 Supermarine Type 394
 Supermarine Type 395
 Supermarine Type 396
 Supermarine Type 398 – prototype navalised Attacker
 Supermarine Type 500 – Proposal variant of type 392 (1946)
 Supermarine Type 501    Spitfire Experimental
 Supermarine Type 503 Sea Otter
 Supermarine Type 504    S.14/44 ASR
 Supermarine Type 505
 Supermarine Type 508
 Supermarine Type 510
 Supermarine Type 513 – 2nd prototype navalised Attacker
 Supermarine Type 517
 Supermarine Type 520 – Projected conversion of second type 510 (1948–49)
 Supermarine Type 525
 Supermarine Type 527 – Proposed Attacker variant with Avon or Tay engine (1949)
 Supermarine Type 528
 Supermarine Type 529
 Supermarine Type 537 – Strike conversion of type 525 (1950) for NR/A.19
 Supermarine Type 541
 Supermarine Type 543
 Supermarine Type 544
 Supermarine 545
 Supermarine Type 554 OR 318 advanced jet trainer of Type 545
 Supermarine Type 558 – Scimitar Mk.2 proposal (1955)
 Vickers-Supermarine Type 559 – supersonic high altitude interceptor design for F.155T

Surrey Flying Services 
 Surrey Flying Services AL.1

Sutro 
(Adolph G Sutro, San Francisco, CA)
 Sutro 1913 hydro-aeroplane

Suzuki 
(Shigeru Suzuki)
 Suzuki Gyro No.2 Tractor

References

Further reading

External links

 List Of Aircraft (S)

de:Liste von Flugzeugtypen/N–S
fr:Liste des aéronefs (N-S)
nl:Lijst van vliegtuigtypes (N-S)
pt:Anexo:Lista de aviões (N-S)
ru:Список самолётов (N-S)
sv:Lista över flygplan/N-S
vi:Danh sách máy bay (N-S)